Kate Ellis may refer to:

 Kate Ellis (author), British author
 Kate Ellis (politician) (born 1977), Australian politician